The 2009 NCAA Division III Men's Ice Hockey Tournament was the culmination of the 2008–09 season, the 26th such tournament in NCAA history. It concluded with Neumann defeating Gustavus Adolphus in the championship game 4-1. All First Round and Quarterfinal matchups were held at home team venues, while all succeeding games were played at the Herb Brooks Arena in Lake Placid, New York.

Neumann became the first team to win the tournament by playing in four different rounds.

Qualifying teams
The following teams qualified for the tournament. Automatic bids were offered to the conference tournament champion of seven different conferences. Four at-large bids were available for the highest-ranked non-conference tournament champions (overall seed in parentheses).

Format
The tournament featured four rounds of play. All rounds were Single-game elimination. The top four teams were arranged so that were they all to reach the national semifinal, the first overall seed would play the fourth seed while the second seed would play the third seed. Because two western teams were among the top four overall seeds, the other two western teams were advanced to the quarterfinal round in order to prevent lower-seeded teams from having to travel long-distances in the first two rounds.

In the First Round, because each team was from the same region, the teams were seeded according to their ranking with the second seed playing the seventh seed, the third seed playing the sixth seed and the fourth seed playing the fifth seed. The Quarterfinal round was arranged so that the top eastern seed would play the winner between the fourth- and fifth-seeded eastern team while the winners of the other two first round matches would meet for the other eastern quarterfinal. In the western quarterfinals, the top western seed played the fourth western seed and the second western seed played the third western seed. The higher-ranked team served as host for all first round and quarterfinal meetings.

Tournament Bracket

Note: * denotes overtime period(s)

All-Tournament Team
G: Ross MacKinnon* (Neumann)
D: Andrew Brennan (Hobart)
D: Charles Paterson (Neumann)
F: Jesse Cole (Neumann)
F: Patrick Dynan (Gustavus Adolphus)
F: Matt Ward (Neumann)
* Most Outstanding Player(s)

Record by conference

References

External links
Division III Men's Ice Hockey Record Book

 
NCAA Division III ice hockey